Pepper leaf is a common name for several plants and may refer to:

 Persicaria hydropiper
 Piper auritum, native to tropical Central America
 Piper lolot
 Tasmannia lanceolata, native to southeastern Australia

See also
 Pepper tree
 Pepperweed